The Centre for Economic Policy Research (CEPR) is an independent, non‐partisan, pan‐European non‐profit organisation. Its mission is to enhance the quality of policy decisions through providing policy‐relevant research, based soundly in economic theory, to policymakers, the private sector and civil society. Rather than adopting the traditional in-house ‘think-tank’ research structure, CEPR appoints Research Fellows and Affiliates who remain in their home institutions (universities, research institutes, central bank research departments, and international organisations). CEPR’s network includes over 1,700 of the world's top economists from over 330 institutions in 30 countries. The results of the research conducted by the Centre's network are disseminated through a variety of publications, public meetings, workshops and conferences. Its headquarters is currently located in London.

History 

CEPR was founded in 1983 by Richard Portes, FBA, CBE, to enhance the quality of economic policy-making within Europe and beyond, by fostering high quality, policy-relevant economic research, and disseminating it widely to decision-makers in the public and private sectors. Economics professor Richard Baldwin served as president from 2014 to 2018, and is currently Editor-in-Chief. Economics professor and businesswoman Beatrice Weder di Mauro became president in 2018.

In October 2021, CEPR opened its new Paris office, intended to become its head office. Weder di Mauro commented that CEPR "is an organisation with a strong European identity and, with Brexit, we felt the need to set ourselves up on the continent." The office is hosted by Sciences Po, which is one of CEPR’s Paris Founding Partners together with AXA, the Bank of France, the French Ministry of Higher Education, Research and Innovation, the French Ministry of Economy and Finance, and the Île-de-France Region.

Funding
The Centre is registered as a charity (No. 287287) in the United Kingdom. It is financially supported by a large number of central banks, private financial institutions, and international organisations. These institutional sponsors receive special benefits by obtaining different levels of membership.

Discussion papers
The Centre disseminates its research in the first instance through the CEPR Discussion Paper Series, in which it publishes 870 papers annually. As of November 2018, the CEPR series is ranked fifth among all economics working paper series and journals in terms of total downloads, according to the RePEc database.

VoxEU.org

VoxEU.org is a web publication set up by CEPR to promote "research-based policy analysis and commentary by leading economists".

It was set up in June 2007 in conjunction with a consortium of other European sites, including the Italian site LaVoce (which provided inspiration for the idea and help from the start), the French site Telos, the Spanish site Sociedad Abierta, the German Ökonomenstimme  and the Dutch site MeJudice. VoxEU's stated aim is to "enrich the economic policy debate in Europe and beyond."

VoxEU promotes research-based policy analysis and commentary by "leading economists." The intended audience includes economists in governments, international organisations, academia, and the private sector, as well as journalists specializing in economics, finance, and business.

The main editors are European economists and economic journalists, including: Richard Baldwin, Carol Propper, Tito Boeri, Juanjo Dolado, Romesh Vaitilingam, and Charles Wyplosz.

According to its own statement VoxEU receives about a half million page views per month.

Clive Crook in his blog discusses favorably Vox's contribution to policy debates.

Geneva Report

Every year since 1999, CEPR has published the Geneva Report on the World Economy as a joint project with the International Center for Monetary and Banking Studies (ICMB), an independent foundation associated with the Graduate Institute of International and Development Studies in Geneva. In addition, CEPR and ICMB occasionally publish special reports as part of the Geneva Report series.

COVID Economics
COVID Economics, Vetted and Real-Time Papers is an economics publication established in late March 2020 and published by the CEPR. It serves as an online-only forum for the rapid dissemination of research on COVID-19. Articles are published as preprints after being vetted by the publication's editors.

Events 
CEPR organises a number of events throughout the year. These can range from open conferences to which anyone can attend, to CEPR members-only meetings.

References

External links
 
 VOX, CEPR Policy Portal
 Lavoce.info | Economia, Finanza, Politica, Lavoro
 Telos
 CEPR Discussion Paper Series

Economic research institutes
Organisations based in the London Borough of Islington
Research institutes in the United Kingdom